Tamara Leigh Nowitzki (born 22 May 1976) is a Paralympic swimming competitor from Australia and a silver medalist at the 2000 Sydney Paralympics..

Personal
She was born in Brisbane.  At the age of 13 months she was diagnosed with cerebral palsy. Nowitzki attended Ferny Grove High School.  She was diagnosed with Dopa-responsive dystonia when she was 25 years old.

Career
At the 1996 Atlanta Paralympics, she finished fifth in the Women's 100 m Breaststroke SB7. Nowitzki went on to win a silver medal at the 2000 Sydney Games in the Women's 100 m Breaststroke SB7 event. At the 2000 Paralympics she was coached by Brendan Keogh.

Recognition

In 2000, she was awarded the Australian Sports Medal and in 2013 she was recognised at the Dickson Citizen of the Year.

In 2012 Nowitzki released her autobiography 'No Ordinary Girl' to raise awareness of the rare condition Dopa-responsive Dystonia which is often misdiagnosed as cerebral palsy and to reduce the stigma surrounding mental illness.

References

Further reading
 Nowitzki, Tamara No ordinary girl, Salisbury, Qld. : Boolarong Press, 2012.

External links
Personal website

Female Paralympic swimmers of Australia
Swimmers at the 1996 Summer Paralympics
Swimmers at the 2000 Summer Paralympics
Paralympic silver medalists for Australia
1976 births
Living people
Cerebral Palsy category Paralympic competitors
Medalists at the 2000 Summer Paralympics
Recipients of the Australian Sports Medal
Sportswomen from Queensland
Paralympic medalists in swimming
Sportspeople from Brisbane
Australian female breaststroke swimmers
Australian female freestyle swimmers
S6-classified Paralympic swimmers